Klaas Woldendorp (12 February 1871 – 28 February 1936) was a Dutch sports shooter. He competed in two events at the 1920 Summer Olympics.

References

External links
 

1871 births
1936 deaths
Dutch male sport shooters
Olympic shooters of the Netherlands
Shooters at the 1920 Summer Olympics
Sportspeople from Delft